Harlond can refer to:

Literature
 Harlond (Middle-earth), the port of Gondor's capital city, Minas Tirith

People
 Harlond Clift, Major League Baseball player